The 1985–86 Benson & Hedges World Series was a One Day International (ODI) cricket tri-series where Australia played host to India and New Zealand. Australia and India reached the Finals, which Australia won 2–0.

Points Table

Result summary

Final series
Australia won the best of three final series against India 2–0.

References

Australian Tri-Series
1985 in Australian cricket
1985 in Indian cricket
1985 in New Zealand cricket
1985–86 Australian cricket season
1986 in Australian cricket
1986 in Indian cricket
1986 in New Zealand cricket
1985–86
International cricket competitions from 1985–86 to 1988
1985–86